Strongylognathus caeciliae is a species of ant in the subfamily Myrmicinae.

References

External links

Strongylognathus
Insects described in 1897